The government of Eastern Equatoria from 2010 took office in Eastern Equatoria State of South Sudan in June 2010 following nationwide elections in April 2010.
On 9 June 2010 the Governor, Brigadier General Louis Lobong Lojore, named his ministers and the County Commissioners.
Nartisio Loluke Manir was appointed Deputy Governor.

Ministers
Ministers appointed on 9 June 2010 were:

County Commissioners
Governor Lobong named six County Commissioners on 9 June 2010 after consultations with community leaders. Commissioners of Budi and Lafon counties were still being discussed.

See also
 Government of Eastern Equatoria 2005–2010

References

Eastern Equatoria
Government of South Sudan